Eduardo José Barbosa da Silva Júnior (born 3 September 1995), known as Juninho, is a Brazilian footballer who plays as a attacking midfielder for Brazilian football club, Marcílio Dias.

Career statistics

References

External links

1995 births
Living people
Brazilian footballers
Footballers from São Paulo (state)
Association football midfielders
Brazilian expatriate footballers
Campeonato Brasileiro Série A players
Campeonato Brasileiro Série B players
Campeonato Brasileiro Série C players
Campeonato Brasileiro Série D players
Liga 1 (Indonesia) players
Sociedade Esportiva Palmeiras players
Grêmio Osasco Audax Esporte Clube players
Criciúma Esporte Clube players
Associação Ferroviária de Esportes players
Guarani FC players
Ituano FC players
Vila Nova Futebol Clube players
Figueirense FC players
Mirassol Futebol Clube players
Paysandu Sport Club players
Paraná Clube players
PSS Sleman players
Expatriate footballers in Indonesia
Brazilian expatriate sportspeople in Indonesia